Lateral genicular artery may refer to:

 Inferior lateral genicular artery
 Superior lateral genicular artery